Carla Nabhan Abdel Khalek (born 14 May 2001) is a Lebanese footballer who plays as a midfielder for Lebanese club BFA and the Lebanon national team.

Club career
Abdel Khalek played for Akhaa Ahli Aley in 2019. She then moved to BFA, playing six games in 2020–21.

International career
Abdel Khalek made her senior international debut for Lebanon on 27 August 2021, as a substitute in a 4–0 defeat against Egypt in the 2021 Arab Women's Cup.

See also
 List of Lebanon women's international footballers

References

External links
 
 

2001 births
Living people
People from Aley District
Lebanese women's footballers
Women's association football midfielders
Akhaa Ahli Aley FC (women) players
Beirut Football Academy players
Lebanese Women's Football League players
Lebanon women's youth international footballers
Lebanon women's international footballers